Demon Cleaner was a Swedish stoner rock band formed in the late 1990s as an instrumental trio by Kimmo Holappa, Martin Stangefelt and Daniel Lidén. They named the band after a Kyuss song. Daniel Söderholm joined as singer soon after and after a few split singles with Dozer they recorded their first full-length album, The Freeflight, which was released in 2000. Söderholm left soon after the recording. Stangefelt took over vocals and Snicken and Ville Astrand joined the band. Daniel Jansson soon took over at bass from Astrand.

Their second album Demon Cleaner was released in 2002.  Daniel Lidén left after its release and the band broke up after a last tour with Mr Pillow on drums.

After Demon Cleaner broke up Daniel Lidén joined Dozer while Daniel Jansson and Snicken created Stonewall Noise Orchestra. Daniel Lidén and Daniel Jansson were also members of Greenleaf.

Members
Early members
Daniel Lidén – drums
Kimmo Holappa – guitar
Martin Stangefelt – bass, vocals
Daniel Söderholm – vocals, guitar  (left after The Freeflight)

Later members
Daniel Jansson – bass on Demon Cleaner
Rickard "Snicken" Ny – guitar on Demon Cleaner
Ville Astrand – bass (live)
Mr Pillow – drums (live)

Discography 
Split singles with Dozer
 Demon Cleaner vs Dozer (1998) – Molten Universe (Single of the Week in the 707th issue of Kerrang!)
 Hawaiian Cottage (1999) – Molten Universe
 Domestic Dudes (1999) – Molten Universe

Albums
 The Freeflight (2000) – Molten Universe
 Demon Cleaner (2002) – Molten Universe

Compilations
 A Fist Full of Freebird (1998) – Freebird Records
 Welcome to MeteorCity (1998) – MeteorCity
 Molten Universe Volume One – Molten Universe
 Graven Images, a Tribute to the Misfits (1999) – Freebird Records
 Molten Universe Volume Two – Molten Universe

References

External links
 Review of Hawaiian Cottage - Highbeam
 Review of Demon Cleaner - Stonerrock.com
 Review of The Freeflight - CMJ online (amy sciarretto)
 Review of The Freeflight

Swedish musical groups
Swedish stoner rock musical groups